Adelelmus is a given name. Notable people with the name include:

Adelelmus of Burgos (died  1100), French-born Benedictine monk and saint
Adelelmus of Flanders (died 1152), hermit and saint